Amanda Tan, RGS (November 30, 1930 – October 6, 2003), commonly known as Christine was a Filipino missionary, nun, and activist, who was known to be one of the key figures who was against the human rights abuses during the Martial law era. She headed the Association of Major Religious Superiors of Women (AMRSP) from 1973–1976, a group of religious sisters who not only vocalized their disdain against the Martial Law dictatorship of Ferdinand Marcos, but also managed to help Filipinos who are suffering from poverty. She, along with eight other religious sisters are known as the Bantayog sisters - honored for living a life resisting against the regime of Ferdinand Marcos by having their names were immortalized on the Wall of Remembrance.

Personal life
Mary Christine Tan was born as Amanda on November 30, 1930 to an upper-class Chinese Filipino family in Manila. Her parents were Bienvenido Tan, Sr., a judge, and Salome Limgenco, a housewife.  She is the fifth amongst her seven siblings, for whom they are: Consuelo, Bienvenido Jr. (who became a member of the Agrava Commission and later the Ambassador of the Philippines to Germany), Teresita, Caridad, Leticia, and Angeles. Tan spent her primary, secondary and tertiary education in St. Scholastica's College in Manila. She graduated with the degree of Bachelor of Science in Mathematics, before joining the Religious of the Good Shepherd (RGS), and was given the name by which she is most recognized today.

She spent the first 16 years of her religious life in the convent.  It was during this time where she became the first Filipino head of the RGS's Philippine Province due to her driven motivation in serving the order.  Her niece Didith Rodrigo, in her interview with Tan and who wrote the book A Life With The Poor, mentioned Tan saying that she does not feel any feelings other than joy whenever she helps people. As mentioned in her own words, she describes these years to be a bit placid:

Despite her position in her congregation, she and other nuns lived in poverty as a way to take their vows seriously.

Role in Martial Law

On the outset of Martial Law in the country, Sister Christine became an outspoken political activist who fought for the restoration of democratic rights. Tan and the rest of the AMSRP members asserted liberation and respect for human rights along with “a weekly compilation of news suppressed by the martial law government”. She was one of the co-heads of the organization alongside Fr. Benigno Mayo SJ and Fr. Lope Castillo MSC. Her political views and statements were in fact not approved by the Catholic Church and she was summoned to Rome to keep out of politics. Despite the dangers of her actions and admonitions from the Vatican, she lived her simple life and continued the fight for freedom. For 26 years, she and her RGS sisters lived in the Leveriza slum in Malate, Manila, where she was exposed to the reality of poverty and the prevalence of crime and drugs.

When she was interviewed by the New York Times in 1981, she recounted her experiences. The RGS were known to be a radical congregation in the 1960s. They were often considered as rebels, but she would term it as a group bolder than them. On the outset of Martial Law, her house was raided due to a warrant of arrest against her. Given that, she was the superior of the RGS (at that time, that congregation had 9,000 nuns worldwide), she and with six other nuns would often be at odds with the authorities. From then on, they vowed to live a life in poverty, without accepting luxuries, not even as simple as an electric fan. The broadsheet managed to get the responses of two of the six nuns who jonied Tan in her mission, Sisters Vincent Borromeo and Evelyn Coronel. Each of them said that it was through their ways they realized how important it is to help the oppressed. Through the teachings of the Vatican II, they were given a challenge as to how they could practice their profession in a society experiencing a huge socio-political turmoil.  Sr. Tan's most prominent answer was when she  said that Filipino women have become more progressive over history in their views of life.

Her charisma was such that some nuns who served under her become heroes on their own right.   Perhaps most famous were the four nuns who died in the sinking of the MV Cassandra which was headed to Mindanao on November 21, 1983. The survivors recounted that these nuns chose not to be saved and instead helped them to safety. In 1984, together with five of her RGS sisters, Tan founded the Alay Kapwa Christian Community. Their mission was to provide a growth in the livelihood and spirituality of their chosen indigent communities. Up to now, Alay Kapwa has extended its reach to the provinces of Cavite, Quezon, and even Cebu.  Rodrigo notes that Alay Kapwa provided the urban poor community with spiritual enrichment programs, feeding programs, day care systems, and educational scholarships. It also managed to create livelihood programs where items like crocheted clothing and soap can be made using simple items.

After martial law and legacy
Following the aftermath of the People Power Revolution in 1986, Sister Christine was named a member of the 1987 Constitutional Convention by President Corazon Aquino. The rationale behind her appointment was to continue her work in giving the poor a chance to participate in making the new Philippine Constitution. In the 1990s, she also became a famous critic of presidential administrations starting from Aquino up to Estrada. Another prominent event that put her into the spotlight was when she became a member of the Philippine Charity Sweepstakes Office's Board of Directors in 1998. In her tenure, she raised awareness of the uneven allocation of the fund disbursements in the agency.

Her name, along with 305 others, was immortalized in the Wall of Remembrance at the Bantayog ng mga Bayani. It was befitting for her to be part of the Wall because of her legacy in restoring Philippine democracy. Her RGS sisters attested that her work helped make the congregation well known in the pursuit of charity and religious service. President Aquino did mention that Tan was one of the few Filipinos who possessed values of integrity, patriotism, selflessness, and dedication.

When Tan was diagnosed with stomach cancer in 2000, her sickness didn't inhibit her from doing what she loved. In her own words, she said:

Tan died on October 6, 2003 (although it was disputed to be October 7) at the age of 72. Her autobiography, which was centered on her story with the RGS congregation and the journey from Eastern Spirituality to Social Justice, was released to the public by her brother Bienvenido Jr. four days after her passing.

See also
 Bantayog ng mga Bayani
 People Power Revolution
 Religious sector resistance against the Marcos dictatorship

References

1930 births
2003 deaths
History of the Philippines (1965–1986)
Individuals honored at the Bantayog ng mga Bayani
Religious workers honored at the Bantayog ng mga Bayani
Martial law under Ferdinand Marcos
Political repression in the Philippines
20th-century Filipino Roman Catholic nuns
Members of the Philippine Constitutional Commission of 1986